"There Goes My Baby" is a song written by Ben E. King (Benjamin Earl Nelson), Lover Patterson, George Treadwell and produced by Jerry Leiber and Mike Stoller for The Drifters. This was the first single by the second incarnation of the Drifters (previously known as the 5 Crowns), who assumed the group name in 1958 after manager George Treadwell fired the remaining members of the original lineup.  The Atlantic Records release was King's debut recording as the lead singer of the group.

History
Leiber and Stoller used a radically different approach to production from what Ahmet Ertegun and Jerry Wexler had employed with the original Clyde McPhatter-led Drifters. The combination of new style and new group fit, and the song reached number two on the Billboard Hot 100, behind "A Big Hunk o' Love" by Elvis Presley. "There Goes My Baby" also hit number one on the Billboard R&B chart. On the Cash Box sales chart, it likewise went to number one for two weeks, in the summer of 1959.

Song
The lyrics are loosely structured, almost free-form at a time when rhyming lines were mandatory. The accompaniment features a violin section playing saxophone-like riffs in rock and roll style. The lead voice is in high gospel-style.
(There goes my baby) Whoa-oh-oh-oh-oh
(There goes my baby) Yeah, yeah, yeah,yeah
(There goes my baby) Whoa-oh-oh-oh
(There she goes) Yeah! (There she goes)

Legacy
This recording introduced the idea of using strings, a Brazilian baion and elaborate production values on an R&B recording to enhance the emotional power of black music.  The string arrangement is by Stan Applebaum. This pointed the way to the coming era of soul music as the popularity of the doo-wop vocal groups peaked and faded. Phil Spector studied this production model under Leiber and Stoller.

In 2010, the song was ranked #196 on Rolling Stone's 500 Greatest Songs of All Time. The song has been covered by many artists, including Jay and the Americans, the Walker Brothers, and The Walkmen.   The song was included in the musical revue Smokey Joe's Cafe.

Charts

Donna Summer version

Donna Summer's version of "There Goes My Baby" was issued as the first single on July 5, 1984, from her 1984 album Cats Without Claws by Geffen Records and Warner Bros. Records. Her rendition was produced by Michael Omartian. The single became a moderate hit, peaking at #21 on the US Hot 100, and in the top twenty of the US R&B chart. It also peaked #15 in Spain Radio chart.  Summer's version of this song features an electro-pop sound and was accompanied by a high-quality music video featuring Summer and husband Bruce Sudano as a down-on-their-luck couple at the outbreak of World War II. The video was played in heavy rotation on the MTV network, showing MTV's continued support of Summer as an artist. With this single, Summer earned her nineteenth - and second to last - US Top 40 hit.

Charts

References

1959 songs
1959 singles
1984 singles
Songs written by Ben E. King
The Drifters songs
Jay and the Americans songs
Donna Summer songs
The Walker Brothers songs
Cashbox number-one singles
Atlantic Records singles
Geffen Records singles
Warner Records singles